Leslie Scott (born December 18, 1955) is a British board game designer and author, best known as the inventor of the game Jenga, which she launched at the London Toy Fair 1983.

Early life and education
Born in Tanzania, Scott was raised in East and West Africa, and educated in Uganda, Kenya, Sierra Leone, Ghana and Taunton, England.

Career
Scott is the inventor of the game Jenga, which she launched at the London Toy Fair 1983.
She founded Oxford Games Ltd in 1991.

She is a Senior Associate of Pembroke College, Oxford and a founder trustee of The Smithsonian UK Charitable Trust.

Honours
She is the recipient of the 2010 Wonder Women of Toys Inventor/Designer Award, and the 2012 Tagie award for Excellence in Game Design.

Private life
Scott is married to the Oxford zoologist Professor Fritz Vollrath. They have two children, Frederica and Digby.

Works

Games
 Jenga
 Ex Libris, the game of first lines and last words
 The Great Western Railway Game
 Anagrams, the game of juggling words
 Tabula, the Roman game
 Bookworm, the game of reading and remembering

Books
 About Jenga, the remarkable business of creating a game that became a household name

References

1955 births
British inventors
Women inventors
Living people
Board game designers
Tanzanian emigrants to the United Kingdom
British designers